Paradox Lost is a BBC Books original novel written by George Mann and based on the long-running British science fiction television series Doctor Who. It features the Eleventh Doctor, and his Companions Amy Pond and Rory Williams.

The story is about The Eleventh Doctor, Amy and Rory who attempt to stop the evil alien race, Squall, from taking over the world with the help of Professor Angelchrist and an android from the future called Arven.

References

External links 
 
 

2011 British novels
2011 science fiction novels
Eleventh Doctor novels